Kate Wassum is an American neuroscientist and professor of behavioral neuroscience at the University of California, Los Angeles. Wassum probes the neural circuits underlying appetitive associative learning the circuit dynamics that give rise to diverse motivated behaviors.

Early life and education 
Wassum completed her undergraduate degree at the University of North Carolina at Chapel Hill. She completed her undergraduate thesis under the mentorship of Dr. Mark Wightman where she studied the effects of cannabinoid modulation on dopaminergic signalling in the nucleus accumbens of rats. As an undergraduate student, Wassum was second author on the paper they published in The Journal of Neuroscience. Using fast-scan cyclic voltammetry, she helped discover that cannabinoid agonists lead to an increased frequency of extracellular dopamine transients in the nucleus accumbens. After graduating from UNC in 2004, Wassum continued on to pursue her graduate studies at the University of California, Los Angeles. At UCLA, Wassum worked under the mentorship of Dr. Bernard Balleine and Dr. Nigel Maidment studying the role of endogenous opioids in reward learning. Wassum found that the endogenous opioid system is necessary for goal-directed learning and inhibition of endogenous opioid signalling leads to enhanced habit-learning. Her first author paper in the journal Neuroscience highlighted the critical role played by endogenous opioids in learning. Wassum stayed at UCLA for her postdoctoral work under the mentorship of Dr. Maidment. Wassum was funded by the Ruth L. Kirschstein predoctoral NRSA grant in 2007, 2009, and 2010 to fund her graduate work. In her postdoctoral work, Wassum studied dopamine dynamics in reward-driven behaviors. In 2012, Wassum found that phasic mesolimbic dopamine release influenced behavioral control in self-initiated action sequences. Dopamine release preceded the behavioral action closest in time to obtainment of the reward, and after sufficient training but not over-training, dopamine release preceded the action furthest in time from obtainment of the reward. Her results showed the importance of phasic dopamine in behavioral control. In 2013, Wassum and her colleagues found that phasic dopamine release may play an important role in the incentive motivation to seek reward in addition to its role in signalling reward prediction error.

Research and career 
Wassum started her own lab at UCLA in 2011 where she is currently an associate professor of Behavioral Neuroscience in the Psychology Department. The Wassum Lab studies the neural circuits underlying reward learning and associated motivated behaviors and decision making. One of her current and longer lasting projects is dissecting the reciprocal cortical-amygdala circuit that mediates reward learning and memory retrieval to make informed future decisions. This project was the basis for her first NIH R01 grant for the lab. Wassum has since begun to explore the regulation of learning and behavior at the epigenetic level to understand how histone deacetylation regulates habit formation. A recent paper from her lab showed blocking HDAC3 activity at the promoters of genes involved in learning led to accelerated habit formation, while over-expression of the histone deacetylase HDAC3 prevented habit formation.

In addition to running her lab and teaching courses at UCLA, Wassum is also an associate editor at the Journal of Neuroscience, a senior editor at eLife, an editorial board member at Neuropsychopharmacology, ACS Chemical Neuroscience, and Scientific Reports, and is a consulting editor at the Journal of Experimental Psychology Animal Learning and Cognition.

Selected publications 

 Capturing Habitualness of Drinking and Smoking Behavior in Humans. Ray L, Han D,Grodin E, Bujarski S, Meredith L, Ho D, Neto S, Wassum KM. Drug & alcohol dependence (2019)
 Mesolimbic dopamine projections mediate cue-motivated reward seeking but not reward retrieval in rats. Halbout B, Marshall AT, Azimi A, Liljeholm M, Mahler SV, Wassum KM, Ostlund SB. eLife (2019)
 Distinct cortical-amygdala projections drive reward value encoding and retrieval. Malvaez M, Shieh C, Murphy, MD, Greenfield VY, Wassum KM. Nature Neuroscience (2019) 
 Nucleus accumbens cholinergic interneurons oppose cue-motivated behavior. Collins AL, Aitken TJ, Huang I, Shieh C, Greenfield VY, Monbouquette HG, Ostlund SB, Wassum KM. Biological Psychiatry (2019) BioRxiv
 Habits are negatively regulated by histone deacetylase 3 in the dorsal striatum. Malvaez M, Greenfield VY, Matheos DP, Angelillis NA, Murphy MD, Kennedy PJ, Wood MA, Wassum KM. Biological Psychiatry (2018) 84(5) 383-392 BioRxiv
 Regulation of habit formation in the dorsal striatum. Malvaez M, Wassum KM. Current Opinion in Behavioral Science (2018) 20: 67–74.
 Modulation of cue-triggered reward seeking by cholinergic signaling in the dorsomedial striatum. Ostlund SB, Liu AT, Wassum KM, Maidment NT. European Journal of Neuroscience (2017) 45 (3) 358–364.
 Basolateral amygdala to orbitofrontal cortex projections enable cue-triggered reward expectations. Lichtenberg NT, Pennington ZT, Holley SM, Greenfield VY, Cepeda C, Levine MS, Wassum KM. Journal of Neuroscience (2017) 37 (35) 8374–8384.
 Optogenetic excitation of cholinergic inputs to the hippocampus primes future contextual fear associations . Hersman S, Cushman J, Lemelson N, Wassum KM, Lotfipour S, Fanselow MS. Scientific Reports (2017) 7, 2333.
 Amygdala mu-opioid receptors mediate the motivating influence of cue-triggered reward expectations. Lichtenberg NT and Wassum KM. European Journal of Neuroscience (2016) 45 (3) 381–387.
 Nucleus accumbens acetylcholine receptors modulate dopamine and motivation. Collins AL, Aitken TJ, Greenfield VY, Ostlund SB and Wassum KM. Neuropsychopharmacology (2016) 41(12):2830–2838.
 Dynamic mesolimbic dopamine signaling during action sequence learning and expectation violation. Collins AL, Greenfield VY, Bye JK, Linker KE, Wang AS and Wassum KM. Scientific Reports (2016) 6, 20231.
 Nucleus accumbens core dopamine signaling tracks the need-based motivational value of food-paired cues. Aitken TJ*, Greenfield VY* and Wassum KM. Journal of Neurochemistry (2016) 136:5, 1026–1036.
 The origins and organization of vertebrate Pavlovian conditioning. Fanselow MS and Wassum KM. Cold Spring Harbor perspectives in biology (2015).
 The basolateral amygdala in reward learning and addiction. Wassum KM and Izquierdo A. Neuroscience & Biobehavioral Reviews (2015) 57,271-283.
 Basolateral amygdala rapid glutamate release encodes an outcome-specific representation vital for reward-predictive cues to selectively invigorate reward-seeking actions. Malvaez M, Greenfield VY, Wang AS, Yorita AM, Feng L, Linker KE, Monbouquette HG, Wassum KM. Scientific Reports (2015) 5,12511.
 Probing the neurochemical correlates of motivation and decision making. Wassum KM, Phillips PEM. ACS Chemical Neuroscience (2015) 6(1), 11–13.
 Inflated reward value in early opiate withdrawal. Wassum KM, Greenfield, VY, Linker KE, Maidment NT, Ostlund SB. Addiction Biology (2014).
 Phasic mesolimbic dopamine signaling encodes the facilitation of incentive motivation produced by repeated cocaine exposure. Ostlund SB, LeBlanc KH, Kosheleff AR, Wassum KM, Maidment NT. Neuropsychopharmacology (2014) 39, 2441–2449.
 Phasic mesolimbic dopamine release tracks reward seeking during expression of Pavlovian-to-instrumental transfer. Wassum KM, Ostlund SB, Loewinger GC, Maidment NT. Biological Psychiatry (2013) 73(8): 747–55
 Electrochemically-deposited iridium oxide reference electrode integrated with an electroenzymatic glutamate sensor on a multi-electrode array microprobe. Tolosa VM, Wassum KM, Maidment NT, Monbouquette HG. Biosensors and Bioelectronics (2013) 42: 256–60
 Transient extracellular glutamate events in the basolateral amygdala track reward seeking actions. Wassum KM, Tolosa VM, Tseng TC, Balleine BW, Monbouquette HG, Maidment NT. Journal of Neuroscience (2012) 32(8): 2734–2746.
 Phasic mesolimbic dopamine signaling precedes and predicts performance of a self-initiated action sequence. Wassum KM, Ostlund SB, Maidment NT. Biological Psychiatry Priority Communication (2012) 71(10): 846–54.
 Differential dependence of Pavlovian incentive motivation and instrumental incentive learning processes on dopamine signaling. Wassum KM, Ostlund SB, Balleine BW, Maidment NT. Learning and Memory (2011)18(7): 475–83.
 Mu opioid receptor activation in the basolateral amygdala mediates the learning of increases, but not decreases in the incentive value of a food reward. Wassum KM, Cely IC, Balleine BW, Maidment NT. Journal of Neuroscience (2011) 31(5): 1591–1599.
 Extracellular dopamine levels in striatal subregions track shifts in motivation and response cost during instrumental conditioning. Ostlund SB, Wassum KM, Murphy NP, Balleine BW, Maidment NT. Journal of Neuroscience (2011) 31(1): 200–207.
 Disruption of endogenous opioid activity during instrumental learning enhances habit acquisition. Wassum KM, Cely IC, Ostlund SB, Maidment NT, Balleine BW. Neuroscience (2009) 163(3): 770–80.
 Distinct opioid circuits determine the palatability and the desirability of rewarding events. Wassum KM, Ostlund SB, Maidment NT, Balleine BW. Proceedings of the National Academy of Sciences USA (2009) 106(30): 12512–7.
 Silicon wafer-based platinum microelectrode array biosensor for near real-time measurement of glutamate in vivo. Wassum KM, Tolosa VM, Wang J, Walker E, Monbouquette HG, Maidment NT. Sensors (2008)8: 5023–5036.
 Dopamine release is heterogeneous within microenvironments of the rat nucleus accumbens. Wightman RM Heien ML, Wassum KM, Khan AS, Stuber GD, Ariansen JL, Aragona BJ, Cleaveland NA, Cheer JF, Phillips PEM, Carelli RM. European Journal of Neuroscience (2007)  26(7): 2046–54.
 Phasic dopamine release evoked by abused substances requires cannabinoid receptor activation. Cheer JF, Wassum KM, Sombers LA, Heien ML, Ariansen JL, Aragona B, Phillips PE, Wightman RM. Journal of Neuroscience (2007) 27(4): 791–5.
 Cannabinoid Modulation of electrically evoked pH and oxygen transients in the nucleus accumbens of awake rats. Cheer JF, Wassum KM, Wightman RM. Journal of Neurochemistry (2006)97: 1145–1154.
 Real-time measurement of dopamine fluctuations after cocaine in the brain of behaving rats. Heien MLAV, Khan AS, Ariansen JL, Cheer JF, Phillips PEM, Wassum KM, Wightman RM. Proceedings of the National Academy of Sciences U S A (2005)102(29): 10023–8.
 Cannabinoids enhance subsecond dopamine release in the nucleus accumbens of awake rats. Cheer JF, Wassum KM, Heien ML, Phillips PE, Wightman RM. Journal of Neuroscience (2004)24(18): 4393–400.

Personal life 
Wassum has one daughter and enjoys photography.

References

External links

Year of birth missing (living people)
Living people
American women neuroscientists
American neuroscientists
21st-century American women